North Cape (also Northcape) is an unincorporated community in the towns of Norway and Raymond, in Racine County, Wisconsin, United States.

Adam Apple (1831-1905), a farmer and politician, lived on a farm in North Cape.

References

Unincorporated communities in Racine County, Wisconsin
Unincorporated communities in Wisconsin